Adjustable shelving allows more flexible use of shelves to hold items of value for storage, display or sale. Like fixed shelves, the horizontal planes are normally made of strong materials such as wood or steel (occasionally glass or other materials), but their exact vertical positioning can be varied - usually through the use of uprights into which supporting brackets or the shelves themselves can be fixed at different heights.

For example, in furniture such as a cabinet or bookcase, the vertical elements may be drilled to allow metal or plastic supports to be inserted, and the shelf then rests on the supports. Alternative approaches include the use of grooves on the uprights at either end of the shelf into which the shelf can be inserted.

Purpose-built adjustable shelving systems can be fixed to a wall or free-standing.
Common wall-fixed systems comprise parallel metal strips (attached to the wall by screws) which have slots into which brackets can be fitted to hold shelves.
Free-standing shelf frames are also usually manufactured from metal (usually steel), though the shelves may be made of wood. The metal frames may be formed of slotted angle - steel strips longitudinally pressed into a right-angle or L-shaped section (C- and box-section systems are also used where structures have to carry particularly heavy loads); these sections are perforated with circular holes or elongated slots to allow shelves to be mounted directly or fixed using nuts and bolts. The most heavy duty form of adjustable shelving is pallet racking.

History
Seeking a more flexible and reusable alternative to wooden shelving to store paper and other consumables in his London-based printing business, engineer Demetrius Comino invented the slotted angle steel construction system, Dexion, and began production in 1947. This quickly became popular internationally for domestic and commercial shelving, warehouse pallet racking and other purposes. Dexion and other shelving and racking brands are still marketed by the Norwegian Constructor Group.

The Dexion-style slotted angle or angle iron was also widely copied by other manufacturers using different configurations of slots, different metal thicknesses, and different metals (e.g.: aluminum).

References

Cabinets (furniture)
Furniture
Warehouses